Stella Maris School is a coeducational, independent school, in Heaton Mersey, Stockport England, founded in 1976.

The school is open to all denominations and is a non profit making organisation. The school is registered with the Department for Education and Employment. It occupies a Victorian, Grade II listed building on St John's Road which was formerly St. John's school and has around 70 pupils from nursery to year 6, which makes the average class size 14 pupils or less.

The school has a number of notable former pupils, including historian and strategist Matthew Kay, and former world champion swimmer James Hickman.

The name 'Stella Maris' is a Latin phrase meaning 'Star of the Sea'.

References

External links
 Stella Maris School

Private schools in the Metropolitan Borough of Stockport
Educational institutions established in 1976
1976 establishments in England
Grade II listed buildings in the Metropolitan Borough of Stockport
Roman Catholic private schools in the Diocese of Salford